Juliusz Madecki (born 17 June 1979) is an Austrian rower. He competed in the men's lightweight coxless four event at the 2004 Summer Olympics.

References

1979 births
Living people
Austrian male rowers
Olympic rowers of Austria
Rowers at the 2004 Summer Olympics
Sportspeople from Wrocław